Georgios Dedas (alternate spellings: Giorgos, Yiorgos) (Greek: Γιώργος Δέδας; born January 2, 1980) is a retired Greek professional basketball player and professional basketball coach. During his playing career, at a height of 2.00 m (6'6 ") tall and a weight of 100 kg (220 lbs.), he played at the shooting guard and small forward positions.

Professional career
After playing basketball as a youth in Kilkis, with the youth teams of Aetos Kilkis, Dedas began his professional career in 1999, with MENT Thessaloniki. In 2003, he moved to Iraklis Thessaloniki. In 2006, he joined Breogan Lugo. He then moved to Beirasar Rosalia in 2007. He then joined Caceres 2016 in 2009.

In 2010, he moved to PAOK Thessaloniki. He joined Rethymno in 2011, and returned to PAOK in 2012. He extended his contract with PAOK in 2014. He retired from playing professional basketball in 2016.

National team career
Dedas won the silver medal at the 2005 Mediterranean Games, while playing with Greece's under-26 national selection.

Coaching career
Dedas started his professional basketball coaching career as an assistant coach of AEK Athens in 2016. In 2022 Dedas has won Lithuanian League being assistant coach of BC Rytas Vilnius.

Personal life
Dedas' younger brother, Stefanos, is also a professional basketball head coach. He has coached Gaziantep, of the Turkish Super League, among other clubs.

Awards and accomplishments
2005 Mediterranean Games: 
2013 Greek All-Star Game: 3 Point Shootout Contest Champion

References

External links
EuroCup Player Profile
FIBA Europe Player Profile
Eurobasket.com Player Profile
Greek Basket League Player Profile 
Hellenic Federation Profile 
Spanish 2nd Division Player Profile 

1980 births
Living people
Cáceres Ciudad del Baloncesto players
Greek basketball coaches
Greek expatriate basketball people in Spain
Greek Basket League players
Iraklis Thessaloniki B.C. players
Mediterranean Games medalists in basketball
MENT B.C. players
P.A.O.K. BC players
Rethymno B.C. players
Shooting guards
Small forwards
Mediterranean Games silver medalists for Greece
Competitors at the 2005 Mediterranean Games
Sportspeople from Kilkis